Ksenia Anatolyevna Kamkova (born 5 December 2002) is a Russian artistic gymnast. She is the 2018 Russian national silver medalist on beam.

References

External links 
 Ksenia Kamkova profile on the Russia Artistic Gymnastics Federation website

2002 births
Living people
Russian female artistic gymnasts
Sportspeople from Yekaterinburg
21st-century Russian women